Jñāna Vigraham is a distinctively styled statue of the revered saint Sree Nārāyana Guru. In Sanskrit, the word Jñāna means knowledge, and Vigraham is the common term for statue (or embodiment). The name Jñāna Vigraham signifies embodiment of knowledge. The first such statue was carved in wood and portrays facial likeness to Nārāyana Guru.

The overall iconography incorporates aesthetic design elements, Sanskrit words of reverence, and symbolic depiction of the Guru's spiritual reform initiative, concepts of human equality and knowledge universe arivu. The aesthetic elements of the design of a Jñāna Vigraham conform to ancient Eastern philosophic and religious iconography and carvings commonly seen across Hinduism, Buddhism and Jainism.

The first Jñāna Vigraham

The first Jñāna Vigraham was designed and commissioned by a private art collector and researcher of Nārāyana Guru's philosophy and teachings. It was primarily intended as a trendsetter to improve the quality of Nārāyana Guru's statues, kept in homes and in small chapel-like places of reverence and worship called 'Guru Mandirams'. These shrines dot the length and breadth of Kerala, the south-western part of India where Nārāyana Guru was born and lived during the period 1856 to 1928.

The Jñāna Vigraham was sculptured in wood by the sculptor Artist Mani Mesthiri of Thiruvananthapuram, Kerala, during 2006-2007. The work signified the period commemorating one and a half centuries since the Guru's birth, as well as the 75th anniversary of the annual pilgrimage to Sivagiri, the chosen spiritual abode and eternal resting place of saint Nārāyana Guru.

Design elements

The design of Jñāna Vigraham incorporates three parts of its structure - the anatomical statue, the pedestal and the radiance board (Prabha).

The anatomical statue

The core anatomical statue is devoid of any decorative elements. It is a lifelike figure of Nārāyana Guru, supposedly in his mid-life, in a seated posture and with hands in the ‘dharmachakra mudra’, the gesture of teaching usually interpreted as turning the wheel of righteousness. The hands are held level with the heart, the thumbs and index fingers form circles, symbolising the teachings of the Nārāyana Guru. The legs are placed in ‘vajrāsana’ an iconographic yoga posture (also referred to as ‘padmasana’), symbolising that Narayana Guru had mastered various yoga practices and endorsed Raja Yoga, which is yoga of meditation and also incorporates Hatha Yoga.

The pedestal

The pedestal has three front-facing panels with relief carvings. The centre panel depicts the conch and lotus, the traditional Eastern symbol of dharma. One of the side panels illustrate the historic consecration of the Sivalinga in 1888 at Aruvippuram; an action of Nārāyana Guru that broke the centuries-old tradition of such spiritual practices that was reserved as a prerogative of orthodox priests of those days. The third panel depicts the eastern proverbial blind men and an elephant as represented by Nārāyana Guru in verse 44 of the Guru's philosophical masterpiece and scripture Atmopadesa Satakam (one hundred verses of self-instruction).

The radiance board

The radiance board providing the backdrop and halo for the statue incorporates decorative elements and symbolism. The overall structure of the backdrop displays likeness to the Sarnath Buddha. The lower portion of the board figures the relief carvings of two elephants in outward facing and welcoming posture signifying Nārāyana Guru's openness to the views and beliefs of other religions and philosophies. The radiance board also has relief carvings of fluttering birds representing the Guru's words in verse 8 of the scripture Atmopadesa Satakam. The six fluttering birds represent the five senses and the sixth sense of philosophical intuition as visualised by the designers to venerate the Guru. The relief carvings of the birds are intertwined with creepers and flowers signifying the growth and fruition of wisdom.

Words of reverence

The Jñāna Vigraham incorporates the citation of a befitting Sanskrit verse from the ancient Indian scripture Bhagavata Purana to revere Nārāyana Guru as follows:

eke tvākhila-karmāni
sannyasyopaśamaḿ gatāḥ
jñānino jñāna-yajñena
yajanti jñāna-vigraham

Translation: In pursuit of spiritual knowledge, some persons renounce all material activities and, having thus become peaceful, perform the sacrifice of philosophic investigation to worship You, the embodiment of knowledge.

References
The Life and Teachings of Narayana Guru – Nataraja Guru
The Golden Age of Sculpture in Sri Lanka – Ulrich von Schroeder
The Vision of The Buddha – Tom Lowenstein
Atmopadesa Satakam – Sree Narayana Guru
Bhagavata Purana (Verse 10.40.6)

External links

A 2007 feature on the Jñāna Vigraham in The Hindu newspaper.

Narayana Guru
Indian sculpture
Hindu art
Indian iconography